The 2017 Westmeath Senior Football Championship is the 113th edition of the Westmeath GAA's premier club Gaelic football tournament for senior graded teams in County Westmeath, Ireland. The tournament consists of 12 teams, with the winner going on to represent Westmeath in the Leinster Senior Club Football Championship. The championship starts with a group stage and then progresses to a knock out stage.

St. Loman's Mullingar were the defending champions after they defeated Tyrrellspass in the previous years final to complete a "2-in-a-row" of titles.

This was Rosemount's return to the senior grade after a 17-year exodus when claiming the 2016 Westmeath Intermediate Football Championship title.

Team Changes

The following teams have changed division since the 2016 championship season.

To S.F.C.
Promoted from 2016 Westmeath Intermediate Football Championship
 Rosemount  -  (Intermediate Champions)

From S.F.C.
Relegated to 2017 Westmeath Intermediate Football Championship
 St. Malachy's

Group stage
All 12 teams enter the competition at this stage.

The competition split into two groups, based on their performance in the 2016 Group stages. Group 1 consists of teams who reached the Quarter-finals last year or better. Group 2 consists of two bottom placed finishers in Group 1 last year as well as 3rd and 4th placed in Group 2 last year, the 2016 Relegation Playoff winners and the 2016 Intermediate champions.

The top 2 teams in Group 1 go into the Semi-finals, where they await the winners of the Quarter-finals, which are composed of the 3rd and 4th placed teams in Group 1 along with the top 2 finishers in Group 2. The bottom 2 teams in Group 2 will enter a Relegation Playoff.

Caulry were defeated in the Relegation Play-off, and hence were relegated to the 2018 I.F.C. after three seasons in the top flight.

Group A

Round 1

Round 2

Round 3

Round 4

Round 5

Group B

Round 1

Round 2

Round 3

Round 4

Round 5

Knock-out stages

Relegation final
The bottom finisher from both groups qualify for the Relegation final. The loser will be relegated to the 2017 Intermediate Championship.

 Maryland 0-13, 1-9 Caulry, Tubberclair, 2/9/2017,

Finals
There are 2 groups called Group A and B. The top finisher in each group qualify for the Semi-finals directly. The second and the third-placed finishers in both groups will qualify for the Quarter-finals.

Quarter-finals

Semi-finals

Final

Leinster Senior Club Football Championship

References

External links

Westmeath Senior Football Championship
Westmeath Senior Football Championship